The 1925 Central Michigan Dragons football team represented Central Michigan Normal School, later renamed Central Michigan University, as an independent during the 1925 college football season. In their second and final season under head coach Lester Barnard, the Central Michigan football team compiled a 4–1–3 record, shut out six of eight opponents, and outscored all opponents by a combined total of 93 to 20. The team's victories included games against Northern State Teachers (8-0), Valparaiso (41-0), and Detroit City College (18–6).  It played three scoreless ties (Detroit frosh, Western State Teachers, and Albion), and its sole loss was to Alma College by a 14–0 score.

After the 1925 season, Lester Barnard resigned as the team's head football coach and accepted a coaching position at Kalamazoo College, where his twin brother Chester was also a coach. In his two years as head coach at Central Michigan, Barnard compiled a record of 11–2–3, and his teams shut out 12 of 16 opponents and outscored all opponents, 251 to 39.

Schedule

References

Central Michigan
Central Michigan Chippewas football seasons
Central Michigan Dragons football